Holabird is an unincorporated community in Hyde County, South Dakota, United States. Although not tracked by the Census Bureau, Holabird has been assigned the ZIP code of 57540.

History
Holabird was the maiden name of a railroad official's wife, the daughter of Connecticut lieutenant governor William S. Holabird. The community got its start when the railroad was extended to that point. A post office was established in Holabird in 1884.

References

Unincorporated communities in Hyde County, South Dakota
Unincorporated communities in South Dakota